Redmain is a small hamlet in the Isel Valley and parish of Blindcrake within the Lake District National Park in Cumbria, England. Nearby are the hamlets of Isel and Sunderland and the village of Blindcrake.

The hamlet is just under four miles north-east of Cockermouth, off the old Roman road to Carlisle (A595). It is 12 miles from Keswick and, along the A66, it is 29 miles from the M6 motorway at Penrith.

Etymology
The name Redmain was first recorded in 1188 as "Redeman", and is of Brittonic origin. The first element is rïd meaning "a ford", the second may be the definite article ï, and the final element is -maɣn meaning "a stone" (Welsh ryd-y-maen).

See also

Listed buildings in Blindcrake

References

Hamlets in Cumbria
Allerdale